Extraction is a 2020 American action thriller film directed by Sam Hargrave (in his feature directorial debut) and written by Joe Russo, based on the graphic novel Ciudad by Ande Parks, Joe Russo, Anthony Russo, Fernando León González, and Eric Skillman. The film's cast features Chris Hemsworth, Rudhraksh Jaiswal, Randeep Hooda (his international film debut), Golshifteh Farahani, Pankaj Tripathi and David Harbour. The film is about an Australian black ops mercenary whose mission to save an Indian crime lord's kidnapped son in Dhaka, Bangladesh goes awry when he is double-crossed.

Netflix released Extraction on April 24, 2020. The film received praise for its performances and action sequences but was criticized for its screenplay. It became the most-watched original film in Netflix's history, according to Netflix, with a reported viewership of 99 million households in its first four weeks. A sequel is in development.

Plot

Ovi Mahajan – son of incarcerated Indian drug lord Ovi Mahajan. Sr – sneaks out of his house to visit a club with his friend. At the party, Ovi and his friend go to the garage to have a smoke, where they encounter corrupt police officers working for rival drug lord Amir Asif, who shoot Ovi's friend and kidnaps him. After discovering this, Saju Rav — a former Lt. Colonel in the Para special forces and Ovi's protector — visits Ovi's father in prison. Unwilling to pay the ransom or surrender his territories to Amir as it will hurt his prestige, Ovi's father orders Saju to retrieve his son, threatening to kill Saju's own son if he is unwilling to do so. Tyler Rake, a former Australian Special Air Service Regiment (SASR) operator turned black-market mercenary, is recruited by his handler Nik Khan to save Ovi from Dhaka, Bangladesh.

Tyler and Khan's team prepare to extract Ovi, with his father's men set to pay them once Ovi is recovered. Tyler saves Ovi, kills his captors, and takes him to the extraction point. Learning of Ovi's escape, Asif orders the head of the local police, Colonel Rashid, to initiate an immediate lockdown of Dhaka, securing all bridges and travel points out of the city. Ovi's father's men intentionally fail to transfer the funds as it is revealed that Ovi Sr's bank account has been frozen by the authorities, so he had no means to pay the mercenaries in the first place. Saju kills Tyler's teammates and tries to kill Tyler so he can save Ovi himself and cheat the mercenaries out of their payment. Khan arranges for a helicopter to extract Tyler outside the city and tells him to abandon Ovi since the contract has been nullified.

Tyler refuses to leave Ovi behind, haunted by memories of his own son, whom he abandoned after he couldn't stand seeing him suffer from lymphoma any longer. After escaping Saju and the corrupt Dhaka Metropolitan Police tactical units on Asif's payroll, Tyler fights off a gang of boys led by Farhad, a young criminal eager to impress Asif. Tyler calls his friend Gaspar, a retired squad-mate living in Dhaka, and he and Ovi lay low at Gaspar's home for the evening. Gaspar reveals Asif has placed a $10,000,000 bounty on Ovi, which he offers to share if Tyler allows him to kill Ovi. Tyler refuses and fights Gaspar, who gains the upper hand but is foolishly shot by Ovi with Gaspar's own gun. Tyler calls Saju and asks for his help, forcing them to team up to escape Dhaka.

Tyler draws attention away from a disguised Saju and Ovi as the two make their way through a bridge checkpoint before following to cover their escape. Khan and her remaining mercenaries approach from the opposite side of the bridge, as Asif watches from afar with binoculars. In the ensuing firefight, Saju is shot by Rashid, who is in turn shot by Khan. Wounded, Tyler instructs Ovi to run to Khan's waiting helicopter. As a badly wounded Tyler follows, he is shot in the neck by Farhad and seeing Ovi is safe, falls into the river. Ovi, Khan, and the extraction team escape to Mumbai and safety. Eight months later, Khan encounters Asif in a restroom and promptly shoots him. Ovi jumps into his school's swimming pool to practice holding his breath, mirroring the scene where Tyler is introduced. He surfaces to see a blurred vision of a man, resembling Tyler, watching him.

Cast

Production
On August 31, 2018, it was announced that Sam Hargrave would direct Dhaka from a screenplay by Joe Russo. In addition, Chris Hemsworth was set to star in the film. In November 2018, the rest of the cast was set.

Production began in Ahmedabad and Mumbai in November 2018. Filming next took place in Ban Pong, Ratchaburi, Thailand.

The cast stayed in Nakhon Pathom. Principal production ended in March 2019. The film's working title was initially Dhaka but was changed to Out of the Fire, before the final title was revealed to be Extraction on February 19, 2020. The production in Bangladesh was handled by the same team that handled the production of Avengers: Age of Ultron shot in 2014 in Bangladesh.

Henry Jackman and Alex Belcher composed the film score and worked together in 21 Bridges while the Russo Brothers produced the film. BMG has released the soundtrack. English indie rock band Alt-J's In Cold Blood (Baauer Remix) was used for the official trailer.

Reception

Viewership
Extraction was the top-streamed item in its debut weekend, then fell to sixth place (but third among films) in its second week. Netflix estimated the film would be watched by about 90 million households during its first month of release, the biggest premiere in the service's history. The film returned to the site's top-10 during the 4th of July weekend. In July 2020, Netflix revealed the film had in-fact been watched by 99 million households in its first four weeks of release, the most-ever for one of their original films. In November, Variety reported the film was the fourth-most watched straight-to-streaming title of 2020 up to that point.

Critical response
The website's critics consensus reads: "Spectacular stunt work and an electric performance from Chris Hemsworth can't save Extraction from being dragged down by its aimless violence." On Metacritic, the film has a weighted average score of 56 out of 100, based on 35 critics, indicating "mixed or average reviews".

Rohan Naahar of the Hindustan Times praised the performances of Hemsworth and Hooda, and wrote: "Featuring one of the most stunning action scenes in recent memory... [the film] is breakneck and bonkers." Entertainment Weeklys Leah Greenblatt gave the film a "B" and wrote that it "mostly delivers what its swaggering trailer promises: international scenery; insidious villains; a taciturn, tree-trunk Aussie."

Writing for Rolling Stone, Peter Travers gave the film 2 out of 5 stars and said: "Aiming for the fight poetry of the John Wick franchise, Extraction comes closer to a series of stunts strung together to look like an ultraviolent video game (think Manhunt 2) in which the avatars are played by actual humans."

Extraction was criticized by several outlets as having "white savior" elements. Variety called the film "a white-savior version of Man on Fire," while Screen Rant said that the film's "regressive white savior elements" drag it down. In an overall positive review, Scott Mendelson of Forbes wrote: "Look, let's get this out of the way. Yes, director Sam Hargrave and writer Joe Russo's Extraction... is an arguably 'problematic' white savior flick but it’s also a solid action-adventure".

The Daily Star expressed concern over the representation of Dhaka, calling the representation "bleak and inaccurate, but Dhaka nonetheless". BBC Bangla also noted many complaints online about the portrayal of Dhaka and Bangladesh in the film.

Accolades
Marko Forker, Lynzi Grant, Craig Wentworth, and Olivier Sarda were nominated by the Visual Effects Society at the 19th Visual Effects Society Awards on April 6, 2021, in the category Outstanding Supporting Visual Effects in a Photoreal Feature.

Sequel

In May 2020, it was reported Joe Russo had been hired to write a sequel to the film, with the intention of both Sam Hargrave and Chris Hemsworth returning. In December 2020, the Russo Brothers stated that beyond the sequel they hope to develop a series of films set within the world of Extraction to not only explore some of the characters that were introduced in the first film but to potentially launch a cinematic universe. In January 2021, it was rumored that the Russo brothers were also working on an origin story for Randeep Hooda's character Saju.

Principal photography began on December 4, 2021, in Prague, Czech Republic. Filming for the sequel was slated to begin in Sydney, Australia in September 2021, but measures related to the COVID-19 pandemic moved production to Prague.

In September 2021, Netflix released a teaser trailer for Extraction 2, which revealed that Hemsworth will return as Tyler Rake.

References

External links
 
 
 

2020 action thriller films
2020 films
2020s chase films
American action thriller films
American chase films
2020s English-language films
Films about child abduction in India
Films set in Bangladesh
Films set in Dhaka
Films set in Western Australia
Films shot in Ahmedabad
Films shot in Gujarat
Films shot in Mumbai
Films shot in Maharashtra
Films shot in India
Films shot in Dhaka
Films shot in Bangladesh
English-language Netflix original films
Films shot in Thailand
Films scored by Henry Jackman
Films based on American comics
Live-action films based on comics
Films about mercenaries
Films directed by Sam Hargrave
Oni Press adaptations
2020s American films